Dixella nova is a species of meniscus midges in the family Dixidae.

References

Dixidae
Articles created by Qbugbot
Insects described in 1948